The 1979–80 season saw Rochdale compete in their 6th consecutive season in the Football League Fourth Division. They finished in 24th and last position, and were re-elected to the league for the following season.

Statistics

																				

|}

Final League Table

Competitions

Football League Fourth Division

F.A. Cup

League Cup

References

Rochdale A.F.C. seasons
Rochdale